Fathers and Sons is a 1958 Soviet drama film directed by Adolf Bergunker and Natalya Rashevskaya.

Plot 
The film tells about the inevitable conflict of two generations: the younger and older...

Cast 
 Viktor Avdyushko as Yevgeny Bazarov
 Eduard Martsevich as Arkady Kirsanov
 Aleksey Konsovsky as Nikolai Petrovich Kirsanov
 Bruno Freindlich as Pavel Petrovich Kirsanov
 Izolda Izvitskaya as Fenichka
 Alla Larionova as Anna Sergeyevna Odintsova
 Nikolai Sergeyev as Vasily Ivanovich Bazarov
 Yekaterina Aleksandrovskaya as Arina Vlasyevna
 Valentina Bulanova as Yekaterina "Katya" Sergeyevna Lokteva
 Georgy Vitsin as Sitnikov
 Nina Drobysheva as Nanny Dunyasha
 Lyudmila Makarova as Kukshina

See also 
 Fathers and Sons (novel)

References

External links 
 
 Fathers and Sons on Kinopoisk

1958 films
1950s Russian-language films
Soviet drama films
1958 drama films
Lenfilm films
Films based on works by Ivan Turgenev
Films based on Russian novels